This list of ornithology awards is an index to articles about notable awards concerning ornithology, or the study of birds, including both awards for scientists and awards for amateur birdwatchers. The list gives the country of the organization sponsoring the award, but some awards are not limited to one country.

List

See also

 Lists of awards
 Lists of science and technology awards
 List of biology awards

References

Ornithology
 
Awards